Thomas Gobert (Picardy, c. 1600 - 26 September 1672) was a French priest and composer.

In 1630 he was a canon at Saint-Quentin, then maître de chapelle at Péronne, Somme. In 1635 he was appointed aumônier with Armand Jean du Plessis de Richelieu. He succeeded Nicolas Formé as sous-maître of the Chapelle royale. Following the death of Jean Veillot, he was one of the four sous-maîtres with Pierre Robert, Gabriel Expilly and Henry Du Mont. He was charged with the January quarter till 1669.

Works 
Few of his works have survived, the grands motets being lost:
 a Paraphrase des Psaumes de David, en vers françois par Antoine Godeau (1659), à 2 voix ;
 several airs in the Recueil des plus beaux airs of Benigne de Bacilly (1661) ;
 6 pieces in the Livre d'airs de dévotion à 2 parties, of François Berthod (1662).

References 

French Baroque composers
French composers of sacred music
French male composers
People from Saint-Quentin, Aisne
1600s births
1672 deaths
Year of birth uncertain
17th-century male musicians